This is a list of hospitals in California (U.S. state), grouped by County and sorted by hospital name. In healthcare in California, only a General Acute Care Hospital (GACH) or Acute Psychiatric Hospital (APH), as licensed by the California Department of Public Health (CDPH) can refer to themselves as a "Hospital." As of 2018, the CPHD Center for Health Care Quality Cal Health Find database reports 422 General Acute Care Hospitals statewide, as well as 128 Acute Psychiatric Care.

Alameda County
Alameda Hospital – Alameda 
Alta Bates Summit Medical Center
Alta Bates Campus – Berkeley
Herrick Campus – Berkeley
Summit Campus – Oakland (previous merger of Providence Hospital, Peralta Hospital, and Samuel Merritt Hospital)
Anderson Sanatorium – Oakland (closed)
Eden Medical Center – Castro Valley 
Fairmont Rehabilitation and Wellness Center with hospital-based Skilled Nursing Facility – San Leandro 
Fremont Hospital (behavioral health facility) - Fremont 
 Hayward Hospital – Hayward (closed in 1988)
Highland Hospital – Oakland 
John George Psychiatric Pavilion – San Leandro 
Kaiser Hayward – (closed in 2014) 
Naval Hospital Oakland (closed 1996) including nearby San Leandro Naval Hospital (closed 1964)
Kaiser Fremont Medical Center (Kaiser Permanente) - Fremont
Kaiser Oakland Medical Center 
Kaiser San Leandro Medical Center 
Kindred Hospital - San Francisco Bay Area (LTACH) – San Leandro 
Livermore Sanitarium – Livermore (1894– 1965; closed)
Livermore VA Hospital – Livermore
St. Rose Hospital – Hayward
San Leandro Hospital – San Leandro 
UCSF Benioff Children's Hospital Oakland – Oakland
ValleyCare Medical Center – Pleasanton
Washington Hospital - Fremont

Amador County
Sutter Amador Hospital – Jackson

Alpine County
County Hospital (Alpine County, California)

Butte County

Enloe Medical Center – Chico
Feather River Hospital – Paradise
Oroville Hospital – Oroville
Orchard Hospital – Biggs-Gridley
California Park Rehabilitation Hospital

Calaveras County
Mark Twain St. Joseph Hospital

Colusa County
Colusa Regional Medical Center

Contra Costa County
Contra Costa Regional Medical Center – Martinez
Doctors Medical Center – closed in 2015
John Muir Concord Medical Center – Concord (formerly Mt. Diablo Medical Center)
John Muir Walnut Creek Medical Center – Walnut Creek (Level II Trauma Center)
Kaiser Martinez Medical Center – closed in 1998
Kaiser Richmond Medical Center
Kaiser Walnut Creek Medical Center
Los Medanos Community Hospital
San Ramon Regional Medical Center – San Ramon
Sutter Delta Medical Center – Antioch

Del Norte County
Sutter Coast Hospital

El Dorado County
Barton Memorial Hospital
Marshall Medical Center

Fresno County
Coalinga Regional Medical Center – Coalinga (closed)
Coalinga State Hospital – Coalinga (state run psychiatric hospital)
Community Medical Center-Clovis – Clovis
Community Regional Medical Center – Fresno
Fresno Heart & Surgical Hospital – Fresno (part of Community Medical Centers)
Fresno Surgical Hospital – Fresno
Kaiser Fresno Medical Center – Fresno
Kingsburg Medical Center – Kingsburg (closed)
Saint Agnes Medical Center – Fresno
San Joaquin Valley Rehabilitation Hospital
Sanger General Hospital – Sanger (closed)
Selma Community Hospital – Selma
Sierra Kings Hospital – Reedley (acquired by Adventist Health and renamed Adventist Medical Center – Reedley)

Glenn County
Glenn Medical Center – Willows

Humboldt County
Jerold Phelps Community Hospital – Garberville
Mad River Community Hospital – Arcata
Redwood Memorial Hospital – Fortuna 
St. Joseph Hospital – Eureka (includes the General Hospital Campus and Rehabilitation Hospital)

Imperial County
El Centro Regional Medical Center
Pioneers Memorial Hospital

Inyo County
Northern Inyo Hospital
Southern Inyo Hospital

Kern County
Bakersfield Heart Hospital – Bakersfield
Bakersfield Memorial Hospital – Bakersfield
Delano Regional Medical Center – Delano
Kern Medical Center – Bakersfield
Kern Valley – Lake Isabella
Mercy Hospital Bakersfield (formerly named Mercy Truxton)
Mercy Southwest – Bakersfield
Ridgecrest Regional Hospital – Ridgecrest
San Joaquin Medical Center – Bakersfield

Kings County
Adventist Medical Center –  – Hanford
Central Valley General Hospital
Corcoran District Hospital
Naval Hospital Lemoore

Lake County
St. Helena Hospital Clearlake
Sutter Lakeside Hospital

Lassen County
Banner Lassen Medical Center – Susanville

Los Angeles County

North
These hospitals are located north of the 10 Freeway:
Alhambra Hospital Medical Center – Alhambra
Antelope Valley Hospital Medical Center – Lancaster
Aurora Las Encinas Hospital – Pasadena
Barlow Respiratory Hospital – Los Angeles
California Hospital Medical Center – Los Angeles
Cedars-Sinai Medical Center – Los Angeles and Beverly Hills
Century City Hospital – Los Angeles (closed)
Children's Hospital Los Angeles – Los Angeles
City of Hope National Medical Center – Duarte
Encino Hospital Medical Center – Encino
Emanate Health/Foothill Presbyterian Hospital – Glendora
Emanate Health/Inter-community Hospital – Covina
Estelle Doheny Eye Hospital - Los Angeles (Closed)
Garfield Medical Center – Monterey Park
Glendale Adventist Medical Center – Glendale
Glendale Memorial Hospital and Health Center – Glendale
Glendale Research Hospital – Glendale
Glendora Community Hospital – Glendora (formerly East Valley Hospital)
Good Samaritan Hospital – Los Angeles
Granada Hills Community Hospital – Granada Hills (closed August 2003)
Henry Mayo Newhall Memorial Hospital – Valencia
Hollywood Community Hospital of Hollywood – Hollywood
Hollywood Community Hospital of Van Nuys – Van Nuys
Hollywood Presbyterian Medical Center – Los Angeles
Huntington Hospital – Pasadena
Kaiser Foundation Hospital – Chatsworth – Chatsworth
Kaiser Foundation Hospital – Panorama City
Kaiser Foundation Hospital – West Los Angeles
Kaiser Foundation Hospital – Woodland Hills
Kaiser Foundation Hospital Sunset – Los Angeles
Keck Hospital of USC - Los Angeles (formerly USC University Hospital)
LA Downtown Medical Center - Los Angeles 
Lakewood Regional Medical Center – Lakewood
Lancaster Community Hospital – Lancaster (closed)
Lanterman Developmental Center - Pomona
Los Angeles Community Hospital – Los Angeles
Los Angeles County High Desert Hospital – Lancaster (closed June 2003)
Los Angeles County Los Amigos Medical Center 
Los Angeles County-USC Medical Center – Los Angeles
Los Angeles Metropolitan Medical Center – Los Angeles (closed 2013)
Mattel Children's Hospital UCLA – Los Angeles
Methodist Hospital of Southern California – Arcadia
Mission Community Hospital – Panorama Campus 
Monrovia Community Hospital – (closed May 2004)
Monterey Park Hospital – Monterey Park
Motion Picture & Television Hospital – Woodland Hills
Northridge Hospital Medical Center – Northridge
Northridge Hospital Medical Center, Sherman Way Campus (closed December 2004)
Olive View-UCLA Medical Center – Sylmar
Olympia Medical Center – Los Angeles
Orthopaedic Hospital – Los Angeles (outpatient service only as of June 2005)
Pacific Alliance Medical Center – Los Angeles
Pacifica Hospital Of The Valley – Sun Valley
Palmdale Regional Medical Center – Palmdale
Pico Rivera Medical Center – Pico Rivera
Pomona Valley Hospital Medical Center - Pomona, California
Promise Hospital of East Los Angeles – Los Angeles
Providence Holy Cross Medical Center – Mission Hills
Providence St. Joseph Medical Center – Burbank
Providence Tarzana Medical Center – Tarzana
Emanate Health/Queen of the Valley Hospital – West Covina
Resnick Neuropsychiatric Hospital at UCLA – Los Angeles
Ronald Reagan UCLA Medical Center – Los Angeles
St. John's Health Center – Santa Monica
St Luke Medical Center – Sierra Madre (closed January 2002)
St. Vincent Medical Center – Los Angeles
San Gabriel Valley Medical Center – San Gabriel
San Vicente Hospital
Santa Marta Hospital (see Elastar Community Hospital (closed 2004)
Santa Teresita Hospital – Duarte (acute care closed January 2004)
Sherman Oaks Hospital and the Grossman Burn Center – Sherman Oaks
Shriners Hospital – Los Angeles
Silver Lake Medical Center – Los Angeles (formerly City of Angels Medical Center)
Silver Lake Medical Center, Ingleside Campus – Rosemead
Temple Community Hospital – Los Angeles (closed 2014)
Thompson Memorial Medical Center Hospital – Burbank (closed 1997) (formerly Burbank Community Hospital)
UCLA Medical Center, Santa Monica – Santa Monica
USC Kenneth Norris Jr. Cancer Hospital
USC Verdugo Hills Hospital – Glendale
VA Greater Los Angeles Healthcare Center (Veterans Affairs) – Los Angeles
Valley Presbyterian Hospital – Van Nuys
Vencor Hospital – Los Angeles – Los Angeles
West Hills Hospital – West Hills
West Hills Regional Medical Center – West Hills]
West Los Angeles Memorial Hospital – Los Angeles
West Los Angeles VA Medical Center – Los Angeles
West Valley Hospital And Health Center – Canoga Park
Westlake Outpatient Medical Center – Westlake Village
Westside Hospital– Los Angeles
White Memorial Medical Center – Los Angeles

South
These hospitals are located south of the 10 Freeway:
Avalon Municipal Hospital
Baldwin Park Hospital – Baldwin Park
Bay Harbor Hospital – (closed September 1999)
Bellflower Medical Center – Bellflower
Bellwood General Hospital – Bellflower (closed April 2003)
Beverly Hospital – Montebello
Broadway Community Hospital – Los Angeles (closed March 1982)
Brotman Medical Center – Culver City
Casa Colina Hospital For Rehab Medicine – Pomona
Centinela Freeman Regional Medical Center, Centinela Campus – Inglewood
Centinela Freeman Regional Medical Center, Marina Campus – Marina del Rey
Centinela Freeman Regional Medical Center, Memorial Campus – Inglewood (closed in 2007)
Emanate Health/Queen of the Valley Hospital –West Covina
Coast Plaza Hospital – Norwalk
College Hospital – Cerritos
College Medical Center – Long Beach
Community Hospital of Gardena – Gardena
Community Hospital of Huntington Park – Huntington Park
Community Hospital of Long Beach – Long Beach
Daniel Freeman Memorial Hospital – Inglewood (1954–2007; closed)
Doctors Hospital Of West Covina – West Covina
Downey Regional Medical Center – Downey
East Los Angeles Doctors Hospital – East Los Angeles
Elastar Community Hospital – East Los Angeles (2004; closed)
Gardens Regional Hospital & Medical Center (previously known as Tri-City Regional Medical Center)- Hawaiian Gardens 
Greater El Monte Community Hospital – South El Monte
Harbor-UCLA Medical Center – West Carson
Inter-Community Medical Center – West Covina
Kaiser Foundation Hospital – Bellflower
Kaiser Foundation Hospital – Carson
Kaiser Foundation Hospital – Harbor City
Kaiser Permanente Medical Center – Baldwin Park
Little Company of Mary Hospital – San Pedro
Little Company of Mary Hospital – Torrance
Long Beach Community Hospital – Long Beach
Long Beach Doctors Hospital – Long Beach (closed June 1998)
Long Beach Memorial Medical Center – Long Beach
Los Angeles Community Hospital of Norwalk – Norwalk
Los Angeles Metropolitan Med Center – Hawthorne Campus – Hawthorne
Marina Del Rey Hospital – Marina Del Rey
Martin Luther King Jr. - Harbor Hospital – Willowbrook
Memorial Hospital Of Gardena – Gardena
Metropolitan State Hospital (formally Norwalk State Hospital) – Norwalk
Miller Children's Hospital – Long Beach
Mission Hospital of Huntington Park – Huntington Park
Morningside Hospital – Los Angeles (closed September 1980)
Presbyterian Intercommunity Hospital
Providence Little Company of Mary Medical Center, San Pedro Campus
Queen of the Valley Hospital - West Covina
Rancho Los Amigos National Rehabilitation Center – Downey (originally opened as Hollydale Medical center, closed 1988, reopened 1989)
Lakewood Regional Medical Center
Rio Hondo Hospital – Downey
Robert F. Kennedy Medical Center – Los Angeles (closed December 2004)
St. Francis Medical Center – Lynwood
St. Mary Medical Center – Long Beach
San Dimas Community Hospital
Specialty Hospital of Southern California
Suburban Medical Center - Paramount
Torrance Memorial Medical Center
University Hospital – 3787 S. Vermont Avenue Los Angeles (opened before 1958, closed 1983)
Whittier Hospital Medical Center

Madera County
Valley Children’s Hospital – Madera
Madera Community Hospital – Madera

Marin County
Kaiser Foundation Hospital – San Rafael
Kentfield Hospital  (LTACH) (Vibra Healthcare)
MarinHealth Medical Center (formerly called Marin General Hospital) – Greenbrae
Novato Community Hospital

Mariposa County
John C. Fremont Hospital

Mendocino County
Ukiah Valley Medical Center – Ukiah
Frank R. Howard Memorial Hospital – Willits
 Mendocino Coast District Hospital – Fort Bragg
 Mendocino State Hospital – Talmage (1889–1972; closed)

Merced County
Los Banos Community Hospital
Mercy Medical Center Merced Community Campus
Mercy Medical Center Merced Dominican Campus

Modoc County
Modoc Medical Center
Surprise Valley Community Hospital

Mono County
Mammoth Hospital

Monterey County
Community Hospital of the Monterey Peninsula – Monterey
George L. Mee Memorial Hospital – King City
Natividad Medical Center – Salinas
Salinas Surgery Center – Salinas
Salinas Valley Memorial Hospital – Salinas

Napa County
Adventist Health St. Helena,  (formerly St. Helena Hospital) – St. Helena
Napa State Hospital - Napa
Queen of the Valley Medical Center - Napa

Nevada County
Sierra Nevada Memorial Hospital – Grass Valley
Tahoe Forest Hospital – Truckee

Orange County
Anaheim General Hospital – Anaheim
Anaheim General Hospital – Buena Park Campus
Anaheim Regional Medical Center – Anaheim
Brea Community Hospital – Brea (closed)
Chapman Medical Center – Orange
Children's Hospital of Orange County – Orange
Children's Hospital of Orange County at Mission - Mission Viejo
Coastal Communities Hospital – Santa Ana
College Hospital Costa Mesa 
Fountain Valley Regional Hospital and Medical Center – Fountain Valley
Garden Grove Hospital and Medical Center – Garden Grove
HealthBridge Children's Rehabilitation Hospital – Orange
Hoag Memorial Hospital Presbyterian – Irvine
Hoag Memorial Hospital Presbyterian – Newport Beach
Huntington Beach Hospital and Medical Center – Huntington Beach
John Douglas French Center – Los Alamitos
Kaiser Foundation Hospital – Anaheim
Kaiser Foundation Hospital – Irvine
Kaiser Foundation Hospital – Lakeview
Kindred Hospital – Brea
Kindred Hospital – Santa Ana
Kindred Hospital – Westminster
La Palma Intercommunity Hospital – La Palma
Los Alamitos Medical Center – Los Alamitos
Martin Luther Hospital Medical Center 
Providence Mission Hospital – Mission Viejo
Providence Mission Hospital Laguna Beach – Laguna Beach
Orange Coast Memorial Medical Center – Fountain Valley
Orange County Community Hospital – Buena Park
Placentia-Linda Community Hospital – Placentia
Saddleback Memorial Medical Center – Laguna Hills
St. Joseph Hospital (Orange, California) - Orange
St. Jude Medical Center – Fullerton
San Clemente Hospital and Medical Center – San Clemente
Santa Ana Hospital Medical Center – Santa Ana
Tustin Hospital Medical Center 
Tustin Rehabilitation Hospital
University of California, Irvine Medical Center – Orange
Vencor Hospital – Brea
Vencor Hospital – Orange County 
West Anaheim Medical Center – Anaheim
Western Medical Center – Anaheim
Orange County Global Medical Center – Santa Ana

Placer County
DeWitt General Hospital – (1944–1945; closed and 1947–1972; closed), former United States Army hospital during World War II and later a public hospital
Kaiser Permanente Medical Center – Roseville
Sutter Auburn Faith Hospital
Sutter Roseville Medical Center

Plumas County
Eastern Plumas District Hospital
Indian Valley Hospital
Plumas District Hospital
Seneca Hospital

Riverside County
Banning General Hospital – Banning (built to support the Desert Training Center, since closed)
Corona Regional Medical Center – Corona
Desert Regional Medical Center – Palm Springs
Eisenhower Medical Center – Rancho Mirage
Hemet Global Medical Center – Hemet
Highland Springs Surgical Center – Beaumont
Inland Valley Regional Medical Center – Wildomar
John F. Kennedy Memorial Hospital – Indio
Kaiser Foundation Hospital – Riverside
Lakeside Hospital – Perris
Loma Linda University Medical Center  – Murrieta
Menifee Global Medical Center – Menifee
Mission Valley Medical Center – Lake Elsinore
Moreno Valley Community Hospital – Moreno Valley
Palo Verde Hospital – Blythe
Parkview Community Hospital Medical Center – Riverside
Rancho Springs Medical Center – Murrieta
Riverside Community Hospital – Riverside
Riverside County Regional Medical Center – Moreno Valley
San Gorgonio Memorial Hospital – Banning
Temecula Valley Hospital – Temecula
Valley Plaza Doctors Hospital

Sacramento County
Kaiser Foundation Hospital – North Sacramento
Kaiser Foundation Hospital – South Sacramento
Mercy General Hospital
Mercy Hospital – Folsom
Mercy San Juan Medical Center
Methodist Hospital of Sacramento
Shriners Hospitals for Children Northern California
Sierra Vista Hospital
Sutter Medical Center, Sacramento
University of California Davis Medical Center
Vencor Hospital – Sacramento

San Benito County
Hazel Hawkins Memorial Hospital

San Bernardino County
Receiving Hospitals (With Emergency Department)
Arrowhead Regional Medical Center – Colton
Barstow Community Hospital – Barstow
Bear Valley Community Hospital – Big Bear Lake
Chino Valley Medical Center – Chino
Colorado River Medical Center – Needles
Community Hospital of San Bernardino – San Bernardino
Desert Valley Hospital – Victorville
Hi-Desert Medical Center – Joshua Tree
Kaiser Foundation Hospital – Fontana
Kaiser Foundation Hospital – Ontario
Loma Linda University Medical Center – Loma Linda
Loma Linda University Medical Center-East - Loma Linda
Loma Linda Veterans Affairs Medical Center – Loma Linda
Doctor’s Hospital Montclair Medical Center – Montclair
Mountains Community Hospital – Lake Arrowhead
Redlands Community Hospital – Redlands
St. Bernardine Medical Center – San Bernardino
St. Mary Regional Medical Center – Apple Valley
San Antonio Community Hospital – Upland
Victor Valley Hospital – Victorville

Non-Receiving Hospitals (Without Emergency Department)
Canyon Ridge Hospital (acute psychiatric hospital) - Chino 
Loma Linda University Children's Hospital – Loma Linda (On LLUMC campus)
Patton State Hospital – San Bernardino
Robert H. Ballard Rehabilitation Hospital – San Bernardino 
Vencor Hospital – Ontario

San Diego County
Alvarado Hospital Medical Center – San Diego 
Children's Hospital and Health Center – San Diego
Children's Hospital of San Diego – San Diego
Jacobs Medical Center - La Jolla
Kaiser Hospital - San Diego
Kaiser Permanente Medical Center – San Diego  
Kindred Hospital – San Diego
Sharp Mary Birch Hospital for Women – San Diego
Naval Medical Center San Diego – San Diego
Palomar Medical Center – Escondido
Paradise Valley Hospital – National City
Pomerado Hospital – Poway
Rady Children's Hospital
San Diego County Psychiatric Hospital – San Diego
San Luis Rey Hospital – Encinitas
Scripps Green Hospital – La Jolla
Scripps Memorial Hospital  – Encinitas
Scripps Memorial Hospital  – La Jolla
Scripps Mercy Hospital  – Chula Vista
Scripps Mercy Hospital – San Diego
Sharp Chula Vista Medical Center – Chula Vista
Sharp Coronado Hospital – Coronado
Sharp Grossmont Hospital – La Mesa
Sharp Memorial Hospital – San Diego
Sharp Mesa Vista – San Diego
Tri-City Medical Center – Oceanside
UC San Diego Medical Center, Hillcrest – San Diego
U.S. Naval Hospital (Camp Pendleton) – Camp Pendleton
Veterans Affairs Medical Center San Diego – La Jolla

San Francisco County

Almshouse San Francisco (closed), later became the location of Laguna Honda Hospital
Kaiser Permanente San Francisco Medical Center
Kentfield Hospital San Francisco (LTACH) (Vibra Healthcare) - located 6th floor of St. Mary's Medical Center
Park Sanitarium (formally the Scobie Memorial Sanitarium; closed)
Public Health Service Hospital (1912–1981; closed)
Saint Francis Memorial Hospital 
San Francisco Chinese Hospital
San Francisco General Hospital (SFDPH)
San Francisco Marine Hospital (1853– 1912; closed), was renamed as a Public Health Service Hospital.
San Francisco VA Medical Center
St. Joseph's Hospital (1928–1979; closed)
St. Mary's Medical Center 
Sutter California Pacific Medical Center 
Davies campus
Mission Bernal campus
Van Ness campus
UCSF Medical Center
Parnassus campus
Mount Zion campus
Mission Bay campus

San Joaquin County
Dameron Hospital – Stockton
Doctors Hospital of Manteca – Manteca
Kaiser Manteca Medical Center – Manteca
Lodi Memorial Hospital – Lodi
St. Joseph's Medical Center – Stockton
San Joaquin General Hospital – French Camp
Stockton State Hospital – (1851–1996; closed), the first psychiatric hospital in California.
Sutter Tracy Community Hospital – Tracy

San Luis Obispo County
Arroyo Grande Community Hospital – Arroyo Grande
Atascadero State Hospital – Atascadero
French Hospital Medical Center – San Luis Obispo
San Luis Obispo General Hospital (closed June 2003)
Sierra Vista Regional Medical Center – San Luis Obispo
Twin Cities Community Hospital – Templeton

San Mateo County
Gardner Sanitarium – (1900– 1922; closed), Ralston Hall, Belmont
Kaiser Foundation Hospital – Redwood City 
Kaiser South San Francisco Medical Center – South San Francisco 
Hassler Health Farm – San Carlos (closed 1972)
Menlo Park VA Hospital – Menlo Park
Menlo Park Surgical Hospital - Menlo Park 
Mills-Peninsula Medical Center – Burlingame 
San Mateo Medical Center – San Mateo
Sequoia Hospital – Redwood City 
Seton Medical Center – Daly City
Seton Medical Center – Coastside – Moss Beach

Santa Barbara County
Cottage Children's Hospital – Santa Barbara
Goleta Valley Cottage Hospital – Santa Barbara
Lompoc Valley Medical Center – Lompoc
 Marian Regional Medical Center – Santa Maria
Saint Francis Medical Center – Santa Barbara
Santa Barbara Cottage Hospital – Santa Barbara
Santa Ynez Valley Cottage Hospital – Solvang

Santa Clara County
CHoNC Pediatric Hospital– Campbell, California
El Camino Hospital
Mountain View campus
Los Gatos campus (formerly Community Hospital of Los Gatos)
Good Samaritan Hospital – San Jose 
Kaiser Permanente Santa Clara Medical Center – Santa Clara
Kaiser Permanente Santa Teresa Medical Center – San Jose
Lucile Salter Packard Children's Hospital at Stanford – Palo Alto
O'Connor Hospital – San Jose 
Regional Medical Center of San Jose – San Jose 
Saint Louise Regional Hospital – Gilroy 
San Jose Medical Center – San Jose
Santa Clara Valley Medical Center – San Jose 
Stanford University Medical Center – Stanford
VA Palo Alto Hospital – Palo Alto

Santa Cruz County
Dominican Hospital – Santa Cruz
Sutter Maternity and Surgery Hospital – Santa Cruz
Watsonville Community Hospital– Watsonville

Shasta County
Mayers Memorial Hospital District – Fall River Mills
Mercy Medical Center (Redding) – Redding
Shasta Regional Medical Center – Redding

Sierra County
None

Siskiyou County
Fairchild Medical Center – Yreka
Mercy Medical Center  – Mount Shasta

Solano County
Adventist Health Vallejo - Vallejo (Formerly California Specialty Hospital; St. Helena Center For Behavioral Health)  
David Grant USAF Medical Center – Travis Air Force Base
Kaiser Permanente Medical Center – Vallejo
NorthBay Medical Center – Fairfield
Sutter Solano Medical Center – Vallejo
NorthBay VacaValley Hospital – Vacaville
Kaiser Permanente Medical Center – Vacaville (Level II Trauma Center)

Sonoma County
Healdsburg District Hospital – Healdsburg
Kaiser Permanente Medical Center Santa Rosa – Santa Rosa
Sonoma Speciality Hospital (LTACH) (former Sonoma West Medical Center and Palm Drive Hospital) – Sebastopol
Petaluma Valley Hospital – Petaluma
Santa Rosa Memorial Hospital – Santa Rosa (Level II Trauma Center)
Sonoma Developmental Center – Eldridge, opened 1891, the oldest facility in California established specifically for serving the needs of those with developmental disabilities.
Sonoma Valley Hospital – Sonoma
Sutter Medical Center of Santa Rosa – Santa Rosa

Stanislaus County
Doctors Medical Center of Modesto – Modesto
Emanuel Medical Center – Turlock
Hammond General Hospital – (1942–1946; closed) a United States Army hospital during World War II
Kaiser Medical Center – Modesto
Memorial Medical Center – Modesto
Modesto State Hospital – (1946–1972; closed)
Oak Valley Hospital – Oakdale

Sutter County
Fremont Memorial Hospital – Yuba City

Tehama County
Saint Elizabeth Community Hospital – Red Bluff

Trinity County
Mountain Community Medical Services – Weaverville

Tulare County
Kaweah Delta Medical Center – Visalia
Porterville Developmental Center – Porterville
Sierra View District Hospital – Porterville
Tulare Regional Medical Center – Tulare

Tuolumne County
Sonora Regional Medical Center – Sonora

Ventura County
Adventist Health Simi Valley - Simi Valley (Formerly Simi Valley Hospital)
Camarillo State Mental Hospital – Camarillo (1933–1997; closed)
Community Memorial Hospital – Ventura
Los Robles Hospital & Medical Center – Thousand Oaks
St. John's Hospital Camarillo – Camarillo
St. John's Regional Medical Center – Oxnard
Santa Paula Hospital – Santa Paula
SHC Specialty Hospital – Westlake Village (closed)
Ventura County Medical Center – Ventura

Yolo County
Sutter Davis Hospital – Davis
Woodland Memorial Hospital – Woodland

References

External links

California
 
Hospitals